Lewis Albert Gerrard (born 5 April 1938) is a former New Zealand international tennis player. He competed in the Davis Cup a number of times from 1957 to 1966.

References

External links

1938 births
Living people
New Zealand male tennis players